Temple Beth Israel is a Reform synagogue located at 6622 North Maroa Avenue in Fresno, California. Founded in 1919, it was the first and remains the oldest synagogue in the San Joaquin Valley.

, the rabbi was Rick Winer.

Notes

Religious buildings and structures in Fresno, California
Culture of Fresno, California
Reform synagogues in California
Jewish organizations established in 1919
Religious buildings and structures in Fresno County, California